The 1969 Ole Miss Rebels football team represented the University of Mississippi during the 1969 NCAA University Division football season. The Rebels were led by 23rd-year head coach Johnny Vaught and played their home games at Hemingway Stadium in Oxford, Mississippi and Mississippi Veterans Memorial Stadium in Jackson. The team competed as members of the Southeastern Conference, finishing in fifth. Ole Miss ended the year with five straight victories, including three over top ten-ranked opponents. In their 13th straight bowl appearance, Ole Miss defeated then-No. 3 Arkansas in the 1970 Sugar Bowl. They were ranked 8th in the final AP Poll, conducted after bowl season, and 13th in the Coaches Poll, which was conducted before bowl season.

Schedule

Roster

Season summary

Georgia

Cloyce Hinton kicked a school-record 59-yard field goal in the game.

References

Ole Miss
Ole Miss Rebels football seasons
Ole Miss Rebels football